Early general elections were held in the Faroe Islands on 29 October 2011. Faroese law states that new elections must be held at least once every four years; however, either the Prime Minister (Løgmaður) or a majority of the members of the Faroese Parliament (the Løgting) may call an election before the end of this period. The previous elections having been held on 20 January 2008, the latest date on which the next elections could have been held was 19 January 2012. However, the Prime Minister of the Faroe Islands, Kaj Leo Johannesen, announced on 27 September 2011 that elections would be held on 29 October 2011. He gave no particular reason for his decision.

Parliamentary elections must be held no earlier than four weeks and no later than five weeks after the announcement has been made.

Results
The centre-right parties gained significantly, with both the pro-union Union Party and pro-independence People's Party gaining a seat each, while the new Progress movement (classical liberal) – formed seven months earlier as a breakaway from the People's Party – entered the Løgting with two seats. The left-wing and centrist parties all lost ground in consequence.

See also
List of members of the Løgting, 2011–15

References

Faroes
2011 in the Faroe Islands
Elections in the Faroe Islands
October 2011 events in Europe